Patepur is a community development block and Nagar panchayat (since 2020) in vaishali district, bihar state, According to census website all blocks in  bihar state  Nomenclature as C.D.Block ( community development blocks

Villages

Number of Panchayat : 32
Number  of Villages : 138

Population and communities
Male Population : 146150  (2009 ist.)
Female Population : 136695
Total Population : 282845 
SC Total Population : 61662  
ST Total Population : 150
Minority Total Population : 48867  
Population Density : 1102  
Sex Ratio : 935

Education
Literacy rate : 52.5% (2019 ist.)
Male literacy rate : 67.1%
Female literacy rate : 40.2%

School
Primary School : 136 (2009 ist.)
Upper Primary School :  108

References 

Community development blocks in Vaishali district